As of 2020, Estonia has a wind power installed capacity of about 320 MW. All operational wind farms in the country are on land. 
Offshore wind farms are planned on Lake Peipus and in the Baltic Sea near the island of Hiiumaa.

Onshore wind energy 
Three major offshore projects are planned in Estonia, with a total capacity of 1490 MW: a 700 MW project near the island of Hiiumaa by Nelja Energia, a 600 MW project in Gulf of Riga by Eesti Energia, and a 190 MW farm near the western coast of Estonia by Neugrund OÜ.

Statistics 
The table below shows the installed capacity and production of wind farms in Estonia:

See also

 Energy in Estonia
 Renewable energy by country

References

External links

 
Estonia